Șumna is a commune in Rîșcani District, Moldova. It is composed of three villages: Bulhac, Cepăria and Șumna.

References

Communes of Rîșcani District